Electric Loco Shed, Arakkonam is a motive power depot performing locomotive maintenance and repair facility for electric locomotives of the Indian Railways, located at Arrakkonam on the Guntakal–Chennai Egmore section of the Southern Railway zone in Tamil Nadu, India. It is one of the three electric locomotive sheds of the Southern Railway, the others being at Erode (ED) and Royapuram (RPM) and is the oldest in south India.

History 
Steam locomotive sheds used to exist at Arrokonam (AJJ) until the late 1970s. After Southern Railway set a deadline to eliminate all steam locomotive operations by 1990, a push was given towards establishing electric locomotion as the primary motive power, and the Steam locomotive shed was decommissioned. To meet the needs of exponentially increasing rail traffic on the new continuous broad-gauge lines from Chennai to Kanyakumari and Palakkad with the completion of gauge conversion, the steam shed site was selected by Indian railways for a new electric locomotive shed.

New Electric locomotive shed was inaugurated in the 1980s with WAM-4 class. This shed then got 5 WAP-1 from Ghaziabad which stayed until 2002, then they were transferred back to Ghaziabad again. It later got the entire Southern Railway (SR) fleet of WAP-4 locos. Later these were then moved to Erode and Lallaguda. New WAG-7 locos were acquired but later transferred to Erode. In 2009, 30 WAP-1 locos transferred back from Ghaziabad out of which all but 5 were sent to Royapuram in 2011.

All the WAM-4s of this shed have been retired/withdrawn from service. All WAP-1 units has been moved to Erode(EDDS)

Operations 
Being one of the three electric engine sheds in Southern Railway, various major and minor maintenance schedules of electric locomotives are carried out here. It has the sanctioned capacity of 150 engine units. This shed houses a total of 184 engine units, including 90 WAP-4, 91 WAG-5. and 3 WAG-9 Electric loco Shed, Erode is now housing the 2nd largest fleet of WAP-4 in Indian Railways and it caters to many long-distance electric trains.

Like all locomotive sheds, AJJ does regular maintenance, overhaul and repair including painting and washing of locomotives. It not only attends to locomotives housed at AJJ but to ones coming in from other sheds as well. It has four pit lines for loco repair. Locomotives of Arakkonam ELS along with Erode and Royapuram ELS were the regular links for all trains running through Kerala and Tamil Nadu when widespread electrification of railway lines started in Southern Railways. It handled prestigious trains like the Kerala Express, and the Tamil Nadu Express. AJJ locomotives used to be predominantly the regular links for trains traveling to north as well.

Livery and markings 
AJJ based locos can be identified by sticker marks of AJJ ELS. AJJ WAP-4 can also be identified by thunderbolts sign in front and back of the loco. AJJ based WAP-4 has many different types of liveries. Some liveries are given below.

 

AJJ based WAG-9 and WAG-5 have a standard livery all over India

Locomotives

See also 
Electric Loco Shed, Erode
Electric Loco Shed, Royapuram
Diesel Loco Shed, Ernakulam
Diesel Loco Shed, Erode
Diesel Loco Shed, Golden Rock
Diesel Loco Shed, Tondiarpet

References

External links 

 Website
 Particulars
 location
 maps of Indian Railway Loco Sheds
 Loco sheds on line atlas
 showing the Erode Electric Loco Shed

Arakkonam
Salem railway division
Transport in Erode
1980 establishments in Tamil Nadu